Henry Barron (25 May 1928 – 25 February 2010) was an Irish judge who served as a judge of the Supreme Court from 1997 to 2000 and a judge of the High Court from 1982 to 1997.

He was known for granting Ireland's first divorce in 1997, and for his investigation into the 1974 Dublin and Monaghan bombings. His report on the bombings became known as the Barron Report, and it made a contribution towards the 2005 Commission of Investigation: Dublin and Monaghan Bombings 1974.

He was president of the Irish Jewish Museum.

Career
Barron attended Castle Park School in Dalkey, Dublin, before progressing to Saint Columba's College, Rathfarnham. He studied at third level in Trinity College Dublin. Upon his departure in 1950 Barron scored first class honours and was awarded a moderatorship in legal science. In 1951 he began the Bar and silk followed nineteen years later.

In 1982, he was nominated by Taoiseach Garret FitzGerald to become a judge of the High Court. He served in the High Court for fifteen years. In 1997, Taoiseach John Bruton and the 24th Government of Ireland nominated Judge Barron as a judge of the Supreme Court. Upon his appointment to the court, he granted the state's first divorce. He was the first Jew ever appointed to the Irish Supreme Court.

Retirement and Barron Report
Judge Barron retired in 2000. He was then commissioned to investigate the 1974 Dublin and Monaghan bombings and Judge Liam Hamilton replaced him in the Supreme Court. He retired from the bench due to ill health. He investigated bombing incidents in Castleblayney, Dundalk, Dublin Airport, the Miami Showband murders and the deaths of eighteen other individuals. His report, termed The Barron Report and presented to the Oireachtas Joint Committee on Justice in December 2003, was highly critical of the investigation into the bombings by both the Fine Gael-Labour government and the Gardaí, and stated they might have made a better attempt to catch those responsible. He did not lay any definitive blame on the British Government.

Death
Barron died at the age of 81 in St. Vincent's University Hospital, Dublin, on 25 February 2010, having been unwell for a short time. His wife Rosalind had predeceased him by 13 years. 2 sons (Harrie & Robert), 2 daughters (Jane & Anne) and 10 grandchildren outlived him. Barron's funeral took place at Dolphin's Barn's Jewish cemetery on 26 February 2010.

After his death tributes were made by politicians and campaigners for justice:

References

External links
 https://www.independent.co.uk/news/obituaries/henry-barron-irish-judge-who-led-the-inquiry-into-the-dublin-and-monaghan-bombings-1947255.html
 http://www.timesonline.co.uk/tol/comment/obituaries/article7089275.ece

1928 births
2010 deaths
Alumni of Trinity College Dublin
Irish Jews
Burials at Dolphins Barn Jewish Cemetery
Judges of the Supreme Court of Ireland
Lawyers from Dublin (city)
Place of birth missing
High Court judges (Ireland)